The Kauru River is a river of North Otago, New Zealand. A tributary of the Kakanui River, it rises in the east of the Kakanui Mountains and flows into that river west of Kia Ora.

See also
List of rivers of New Zealand

References

Rivers of Otago
Rivers of New Zealand